Juan Palacios (born August 31, 1980) is a boxer from Managua, Nicaragua, with a professional record of 29 wins and 9 losses. He is the former WBC Interim Minimumweight Champion, winning the vacant title against Omar Soto of Puerto Rico on August 2, 2008, in Ponce, Puerto Rico. On November 27, 2009, he lost his title in a unification match against WBC Champion Oleydong Sithsamerchai.

External links
 

|-

Living people
Nicaraguan male boxers
Sportspeople from Managua
1980 births
Mini-flyweight boxers